Vesturbyggð is a municipality located in the Westfjords in Iceland.

Geography
In Vesturbyggð, there are Patreksfjörður with 721 inhabitants, Bíldudalur with 238 inhabitants and Krossholt with 19 inhabitants.

Transport
The municipality is served by Patreksfjörður Airport and Bíldudalur Airport.

Twin towns – sister cities

Vesturbyggð terminated all its twinnings in 2018.

Previously it was twinned with:
 Nordfyn, Denmark
 Svelvik, Norway
 Vadstena, Sweden
 Naantali, Finland

References

External links 
Official website 

Municipalities of Iceland
Westfjords